Simeone Volonteri (June 6, 1831 – December 21, 1904) was an Italian missionary and a  bishop of the Roman Catholic Church.

Life
Simeone Volonteri was born in Milan, Italy. He joined the Pontifical Institute for Foreign Missions in 1855. He was in Hong Kong from 1860 to February 1870. During his stay in Hong Kong, he worked extensively in Tai Wo and Ting Kok. He was ordained bishop in 1874 by Eustachio Zanoli. He was Vicar Apostolic of Southern Honan (China) from August 28, 1882 to his death. He died in Fengqiao, Shangqiu, in Henan province of China.

Map of the San-On District
Simeone Volonteri published the "Map of the San-On District" in 1866. The map was engraved in Leipzig.

See also
 Roman Catholic Diocese of Hong Kong
 Palaeopolis (Lydia)

References

Further reading
 
 
 
Map

External links

 High-resolution digitized "Map of the San-On District"

19th-century Roman Catholic bishops in China
19th-century Italian cartographers
1831 births
1904 deaths
19th-century Italian Roman Catholic bishops